The following is a list of awards and nominations received by American actor and filmmaker Ron Howard. Over his decades-spanning career as an actor, director and producer, Howard has won two Academy Awards, four Emmys, a Grammy, two Golden Globes, and has been nominated for 7 BAFTA Awards. He additionally received the National Medal of Arts in 2003 as well as two stars on the Hollywood Walk of Fame for his contributions to television and motion pictures in 1981 and 2015, respectively.

Organizations

Academy Awards

BAFTA Awards

Emmy Awards

Golden Globe Awards

Grammy Awards

Satellite Awards

Saturn Awards

Guild awards

Directors Guild of America Awards

Producers Guild of America Awards

Screen Actors Guild of America Awards

Critics associations

Film festivals

Other awards

References

External links
 

Lists of awards received by American actor
Lists of awards received by film director